Gottlieb Augustus Treyer (1790–1869) was a German-born British snuff manufacturer and retailer.

He married Mrs Martha Evans who had entered into the business established by Mr Fribourg in 1720, at the sign of the Rasp and Crown. The business became Fribourg & Treyer, and they sold cigars and snuff and cigarettes from at least as early as 1852, from their premises at 34 Haymarket, London.

Customers included David Garrick, King George IV, and Beau Brummell.

He is buried at Kensal Green Cemetery.

References

1790 births
1869 deaths
Burials at Kensal Green Cemetery